Palo Verde Airport  is a paved airstrip located in San Bruno, a town 30 km south of Santa Rosalía, Baja California Sur, Mexico. The airstrip is also known as "Chivato Bay" and the CIB code is used as its identifier.  It handles aviation for the city of Santa Rosalía.

References

External links
 Fallingrain.com: SRL—Palo Verde Airport
 Baja-web.com: Info about Palo Verde Airstrip.
 Mulege.net: Photo of the airstrip office.

Airports in Baja California Sur
Mulegé Municipality